The Highland Christian Church is a historic church at 102 E. Main Street in Highland, Kansas.  It was built in 1904 and added to the National Register in 2007.

It is a two-story building, veneered with red brick on its first story.  Buff brick is used at windows and as quoins at corners.  It has a three-story square steeple.  It was deemed "significant as an example of the Shingle Style adapted to a church building" and "because prominent local builder Ely Saunders oversaw both phases of construction."

References

Churches in Kansas
Churches on the National Register of Historic Places in Kansas
Shingle Style architecture in Kansas
Churches completed in 1904
Buildings and structures in Doniphan County, Kansas
National Register of Historic Places in Doniphan County, Kansas